J-Break (born in Rhode Island) is an American music producer and DJ.

Career
J-Break was introduced to the electronic music scene in 1995 while attending Orlando nightclubs like the Edge, Ultraviolet (UV), and Firestone. At the age of 19, he got his first residency at the former Mimosa nightclub along with other residents Wutam and Davie-D.

In 1999, J-Break started Millennium Breaks Productions, home to releases such as "Feel The Heat", "Drop It Down" and "This Is The Sound of Underground," which became an instant club anthem. Later that year, J-Break became a resident on 96.9 FM in Orlando and WYKS 105.3 FM in Gainesville, Florida alongside DJs Andy Hughes, DJ Sandy & Wutam.

In 2002, Wutam and J-Break joined forces to release their debut mix CD, Biomechanik, the follow-up to Infiniti's "Looking for Something" on Subculture Records. This limited release LP received critical acclaim due to the innovative track selection and mixing. The titular song was released on Afterdark Records, with support from DJs such as Merlyn, Baitercell & Schumacher, and Simply Jeff.

After the success of the Cyberian Knights debut "This Is The Sound of Underground," J-Break joined Jackal from Jackal & Hyde and Dynamix II. Together they formed Cyberian Knights Recordings, a collaborative effort to help popularize electro music. Jackal and J-Break began their world tour in support of their new label, performing in cities like Los Angeles and Barcelona, where J-Break recorded his live mix CD "Barcelona, Spain" for Afterdark Records.

In 2004, J-Break joined forces with Agent K from Agent K & Deuce. Together they formed 

Distorted Recordings, a sub-label of  two artiits' sr sister labels, Cyberian Knights Recordings and Warped Recordz. The first two releas(es by Agent K & The Klubbhe)s, received airplay in clubs and radio stations around the wo.lThey were included d, and ch mix Csuch Ds as DJ Mondo's "Tampa Breaks Vol. 4" and Storm & Trevor Rockwell's "Future Sounds of Breaks."

2005 was a big year for J-Break who performed over one hundred gigs while touring with Jackal & Hyde through cities all over North America. The tour included monster festivals like Ultra Music Festival during the Winter Music Conference in Miami and the annual festival Love Parade in San Francisco. J-Break spent his free time in the studio, collaborating with international artists working in different genres. During this period, the producer released tracks like "Dark Circles" w/ Josef Plante (w/ Autobots (UK) remix) and "Science Fiction" w/ Infiniti. These releases received support from Deekline & Wizard (UK), Exzakt, Baitercell & Schumacher (New Zealand) and others.

2006 had been a year of significant releases for J-Break including three international ones. That year he also undertook a European tour with Agent K during which they recorded their "Live from London CD". The track "American Werewolf in London" featured the UK nu skool artist Screwface on the remix. This release was followed by "Drop It" with ATF's Lethal Agent, released on the Spanish electro label, Dona-Li.

In 2007, J-Break began new studio collaborations with producers of different genres including Deekline & Wizard featuring DJ Assault, MC Messinian of Planet of the Drums, DJ Reid Speed, Oona Dahl, and Josef Plante. After a successful gig in New York, house music became a new love for him. This inspired a new studio album produced with Wutam that would be released in early 2008. The self-titled album featured four singles that charted on Beatport in several genres, including house, electro house and progressive house.

After moving to San Diego, in 2008 international artists such as Tiesto, Hybrid, Miss Nine from Yoshitoshi Records, and Grammy award-winning artist Joachim Garraud supported Wutam & J-Break's new productions. This led to remix offers from world-renowned labels such as Eddie Amador's Mochico Primo Records, Paul Oakenfold's Perfecto Records, David Guetta and Joachim Garraud's Gum Records, and Melleefresh's Play Records.

Later that year, " J-Break was featured on DJ Reid Speed's "Under The Influence" mix CD on Moist Music. Wutam & J-Break signed with dPulse/Sony BMG/Universal Music Group as "Sidetrax" along with David "Scratch D" Noller from Dynamix II, a gold certified electro artist from Miami.

By 2010, J-Break teamed up with Jägermeister house artist, DJ IDeaL to make a remix of BT's classic hit, "Remember." He was also featured on Paul Oakenfold's Perfecto XM/Sirius radio show. International artists such as The Crystal Method, Manuel De La Mare, and Donald Glaude quickly began supporting the team's original productions.

In 2011, IDeaL and J-Break headlined several shows during the Winter Music Conference and Miami Music Week. This culminated with their live set before over 150,000 people at the sold-out Ultra Music Festival in downtown Miami. The duo's set was featured on Ultra Music Festival's UMF Radio Show on XM/Sirius Radio the following week. Their remix of Eddie Amador and Kimberly Cole - "Arrow Through My Heart" hit the Billboard Charts for over 10 weeks.

After performing at Ultra Music Festival '12 and the Madonna album release party during Miami Music Week, the duo spent the rest of the year working in the studio on remixes. They worked with artists such as Adam Lambert, Mickey Avalon, Kerli, and Warren Nomi.

Within weeks of 2013, IDeaL and J-Break collaborated with Grammy-nominated house music producer Eddie Amador to produce "I Need You." The track featured Tom Napack of Vanity Police and formerly of Dangerous Muse. "I Need You" was released by Tiesto's label, Black Hole Recordings. In April, the duo remixed former Pussycat Dolls singer, Jessica Sutta on her song "Again" which peaked at #4 on the Billboard Dance Club Songs chart.

In 2014, IDeaL and J-Break remixed "The Rising" by Five Knives on Red Bull Records, which peaked at #9 on the Billboard Dance Club Songs chart. The duo also had success with remixes for "Bombs Away" by Gia (#3 on Billboard Hot Dance Club Songs chart), "Tonight" by Aiden Jude (#4 on Billboard Hot Dance Club Songs chart and #35 on Beatport Top 100 chart), "Werq" by Carmen Electra, and "Around the World" (#23 on Billboard Dance Club Songs chart).

In March 2015, IDeaL & J-Break remixed Amador and Ultra Nate's song "Take Care Of My Heart," which debuted at #1 on the Billboard Breakout chart and #24 on the Billboard Dance Club Songs chart. The duo also remixed Philip George's "Wish You Were Mine," which peaked at #2 on the UK Singles Chart, #1 on the UK Dance chart and #7 on the Billboard Dance Club Songs chart. "Wish You Were Mine" was certified gold in the UK by BPI with over 400,000 units sold. Other remixes include Motown's Rich White Ladies'"Wimbledon" and "No Bad Vibes" as well as Paris Hilton's "High Off My Love" which peaked at #3 on the Billboard Dance Club Songs and #35 on Hot Dance/Electronic Songs charts.

2016 brought new remixes for IDeaL & J-Break, including Lady Gaga's "Til It Happens To You", which was nominated for the 2016 Academy Award for Best Original Song. "Til It Happens" also peaked at #1 on the Billboard Dance Club Songs, #27 on the Hot Digital Songs, and #19 on the Adult Contemporary charts.

References

http://dancemusic.about.com/od/reviews/fr/JBreakBarc.htm

External links
Official website
Official Twitter account

American electro musicians